Maryland is the richest state in the United States of America, with a median household income of $69,272 according to the 2010 census.  Per capita income was $25,615 in 2000 and personal per capita income was $37,331 in 2003.

Maryland counties ranked by per capita income 

Note: Data is from the 2010 United States Census Data and the 2010-2014 American Community Survey 5-Year Estimates.

References

Demographics of Maryland
Maryland, list of places by per capita income
Income